André Lacroix (born 2 October 1908 in Forest, Belgium - Died in Bruges, Belgium 3 March 1992) was a Belgian tennis player.

Lacroix participated in several Wimbledon tournaments during the 1920s and 1930s. He also played for Belgium in Davis Cup several times, including against Sweden in 1934 and 1937, and Norway in 1936.

References

External links

1908 births
1992 deaths
Belgian male tennis players
Walloon sportspeople
People from Forest, Belgium
Sportspeople from Brussels
20th-century Belgian people